The 2020 United States House of Representatives elections in New York were held on November 3, 2020, to elect the 27 U.S. representatives from the State of New York, one from each of the state's 27 congressional districts. The elections coincided with the 2020 U.S. presidential election, as well as other elections to the House of Representatives, elections to the United States Senate and various state and local elections. The primary election was held on June 23, 2020.

Overview

District
Results of the 2020 United States House of Representatives elections in New York by district:

District 1

The 1st district is based in eastern Long Island, and includes most of central and eastern Suffolk County, including most of Smithtown and all of Brookhaven, Riverhead, Southold, Southampton, East Hampton, and Shelter Island. The incumbent is Republican Lee Zeldin, who was reelected with 51.5% of the vote in 2018.

Republican primary

Candidates

Declared
 Lee Zeldin, incumbent U.S. representative

Democratic primary

Candidates

Declared
Gregory-John Fischer, Libertarian candidate for Suffolk County executive in 2019
 Bridget Fleming, Suffolk County legislator
 Perry Gershon, businessman and nominee for New York's 1st congressional district in 2018
 Nancy Goroff, chair of the Stony Brook University chemistry department

Failed to qualify for ballot
 David Gokhshtein, cryptocurrency entrepreneur

Declined
 Kate Browning, former Suffolk County legislator and candidate for New York's 1st congressional district in 2018
 Dave Calone, venture capitalist and candidate for New York's 1st congressional district in 2016
 John Feal, veteran and nonprofit executive
 Jack Harrington, attorney
 Mark Lesko, former Brookhaven town supervisor
 Jack Martilotta, high school football coach
 Jay Schneiderman, Southampton town supervisor
 Errol Toulon, Suffolk County sheriff

Endorsements

Polling

Primary results

General election

Endorsements

Predictions

Polling

Results

District 2

The 2nd district is based on the South Shore of Long Island, and includes the southwestern Suffolk County communities of Amityville, Copiague, Lindenhurst, Gilgo, West Babylon, Wyandanch, North Babylon, Babylon, Baywood, Brentwood, Brightwaters, Central Islip, Islip, Great River, Ocean Beach, Oakdale, West Sayville, Bohemia, West Islip and Ronkonkoma, in addition to a sliver of southeastern Nassau County encompassing Levittown, North Wantagh, Seaford, South Farmingdale and Massapequa. The incumbent is Republican Peter T. King, who was reelected with 53.1% of the vote in 2018. On November 11, 2019, King announced he would retire after more than 26 years in Congress.

Republican primary

Candidates

Declared
 Andrew Garbarino, state assemblyman
 Mike LiPetri, state assemblyman

Withdrawn
 Trish Bergin, Islip town councilwoman
 Nancy Hemendinger, Suffolk County health official
 Nick LaLota, Suffolk County elections commissioner (running for New York's 8th State Senate district)

Declined
 Phil Boyle, state senator
 Tom Cilmi, minority leader of the Suffolk County Legislature
 Michael Fitzpatrick, state assemblyman
Douglas M. Smith, state assemblyman
 Chuck Fuschillo, former state senator
 James Kennedy, Nassau County legislator
 Peter T. King, incumbent U.S. representative
 Steve Labriola, Oyster Bay town councilman
 Rick Lazio, former U.S. Representative for New York's 2nd congressional district (1993–2001), nominee for U.S. Senate in 2000, and candidate for Governor of New York in 2010
 Steve Levy, former Suffolk County executive
 Mary Kate Mullen, Islip town councilwoman
 Kate Murray, Hempstead town clerk
 Joseph Saladino, Oyster Bay town supervisor
 Erin King Sweeney, former Hempstead town councilwoman and daughter of U.S. representative Peter T. King
 Donald Trump Jr., businessman and son of President Donald Trump
 Lara Trump, campaign advisor and daughter-in-law of President Donald Trump

Endorsements

Polling

with Rick Lazio and Lara Trump

Primary results

Democratic primary

Candidates

Declared
 Jackie Gordon, Babylon town councilwoman and U.S. Army veteran
 Patricia Maher, attorney and nominee for New York's 2nd congressional district in 2014

Failed to qualify for ballot
 Mike Sax, political blogger

Declined
 Steve Bellone, Suffolk County executive
 Liuba Grechen Shirley, community organizer and nominee for New York's 2nd congressional district in 2018
 Christine Pellegrino, former state assemblywoman
 Tim Sini, Suffolk County district attorney

Endorsements

Primary results

Green Party

Candidates

Declared
 Harry R. Burger, mechanical design engineer

Independents

Candidates

Declared
 Daniel Craig Ross, administrative assistant and activist

General election

Predictions

Results

District 3

The 3rd district is based on the North Shore of Long Island, and includes the northwestern Suffolk County and northern Nassau County communities of West Hills, Sands Point, Laurel Hollow, Upper Brookville, Munsey Park, Brookville, Oyster Bay Cove, Old Brookville, Kings Point, Lattingtown, Matinecock, Muttontown, Lloyd Harbor, Syosset, Glen Cove, Roslyn, Manhasset, Huntington, Dix Hills, Plainview, Bethpage, northern Farmingdale, Hicksville, Northport, Commack, Port Washington, and Great Neck. Queens neighborhoods in the district include Little Neck, Whitestone, Glen Oaks, and Floral Park. The incumbent is The Honorable Democrat Thomas Suozzi, who was re-elected with 59.0% of the vote in 2018.

Democratic primary

Candidates

Declared
 Melanie D'Arrigo, activist and healthcare professional
 Michael Weinstock, former prosecutor
 Thomas Suozzi, incumbent U.S. representative

Endorsements

Primary results

Republican primary

Candidates

Declared
 George Santos, Former Call Center Employee

Endorsements

General election

Predictions

Polling

Results

District 4

The 4th district is based central and southern Nassau County, and includes the communities of Baldwin, Bellmore, East Rockaway, East Meadow, the Five Towns, Lynbrook, Floral Park, Franklin Square, Garden City, Hempstead, Long Beach, Malverne, Freeport, Merrick, Mineola, Carle Place, New Hyde Park, Oceanside, Rockville Centre, Roosevelt, Uniondale, Wantagh, West Hempstead, Westbury and parts of Valley Stream. The incumbent is Democrat Kathleen Rice, who was re-elected with 61.3% of the vote in 2018.

Democratic primary

Candidates

Declared
 Kathleen Rice, incumbent U.S. representative

Endorsements

Republican primary

Candidates

Declared
Cindy Grosz, publicist
Douglas Tuman, attorney

Primary results

Green Party

Candidates

Declared
 Joseph R. Naham, chairman of the Nassau County Green Party

General election

Predictions

Results

District 5

The 5th district is based mostly in southeastern Queens, and includes all of the Rockaway Peninsula and the neighborhoods of Broad Channel, Cambria Heights, Hollis, Jamaica, Laurelton, Queens Village, Rosedale, Saint Albans, Springfield Gardens, and South Ozone Park, as well as John F. Kennedy International Airport, as well as parts of Nassau County including Inwood and portions of Valley Stream and Elmont. The incumbent is Democrat Gregory Meeks, who was re-elected unopposed in 2018.

Democratic primary

Candidates

Declared
 Shaniyat Chowdhury, U.S. Marine Corps veteran and bartender
 Gregory Meeks, incumbent U.S. representative

Endorsements

Primary results

Independents

Candidates

Declared
 Amit Lal, logistics coordinator

General election

Predictions

Results

District 6

The 6th district encompasses northeastern Queens, taking in the neighborhoods of Elmhurst, Flushing, Forest Hills, Kew Gardens, and Bayside. The incumbent is Democrat Grace Meng, who was re-elected with 90.9% of the vote, without major-party opposition.

Democratic primary

Candidates

Declared
 Sandra Choi, economic development policy expert
 Mel Gagarin, activist
 Grace Meng, incumbent U.S. representative

Endorsements

Primary results

Republican primary

Candidates

Declared
 Tom Zmich, U.S. Army veteran

General election

Predictions

Results

District 7

The 7th district takes in the Queens neighborhoods of Maspeth, Ridgewood, and Woodhaven; the Brooklyn neighborhoods of Brooklyn Heights, Boerum Hill, Bushwick, Carroll Gardens, Cobble Hill, Dumbo, East New York, East Williamsburg, Greenpoint, Gowanus, Red Hook, Sunset Park, and Williamsburg; and parts of Manhattan's Lower East Side and East Village. The incumbent is Democrat Nydia Velázquez, who was re-elected with 93.4% of the vote, without major-party opposition.

Democratic primary

Candidates

Declared 
 Paperboy Love Prince, rapper
 Nydia Velázquez, incumbent U.S. representative

Endorsements

Primary results

Republican primary

Candidates

Declared
Brian Kelly

Withdrew
 Avery Pereira

General election

Predictions

Results

District 8

The 8th district is centered around eastern Brooklyn, taking in Downtown Brooklyn, Bed-Stuy, Canarsie, and Coney Island, as well as a small portion of Queens encompassing Howard Beach. The incumbent is Democrat Hakeem Jeffries, who was re-elected with 94.3% of the vote, without major-party opposition.

Democratic primary

Candidates

Declared
 Hakeem Jeffries, incumbent U.S. representative

Endorsements

Republican primary

Candidates

Declared
 Garfield Wallace

General election

Predictions

Results

District 9

The 9th district encompasses Central and Southern Brooklyn, and includes the neighborhoods of Brownsville, Crown Heights, East Flatbush, Flatbush, Kensington, Park Slope, Prospect Heights, Midwood, Sheepshead Bay, Marine Park, Gerritsen Beach and Prospect Lefferts Gardens. Prospect Park, Grand Army Plaza and the Grand Army Plaza Greenmarket. The incumbent is Democrat Yvette Clarke, who was re-elected with 89.3% of the vote in 2018.

Democratic primary

Candidates

Declared
 Adem Bunkeddeko, community organizer and candidate for New York's 9th congressional district in 2018
 Yvette Clarke, incumbent U.S. representative
 Chaim Deutsch, New York City councilman
 Lutchi Gayot, business owner and Republican nominee for New York's 9th congressional district in 2018
 Isiah James, U.S. Army veteran and community organizer

Did not qualify for ballot access
 Michael Hiller, plaintiff litigator
 Alex Hubbard, data scientist

Endorsements

Primary results

Republican primary

Candidates

Declared
 Constantin Jean-Pierre, nonprofit executive

Serve America Movement

Candidates

Declared
 Joel Anabilah-Azumah, businessman and Reform candidate for New York's 9th congressional district in 2018

General election

Predictions

Results

District 10

The 10th district stretches across the southern part of Morningside Heights, the Upper West Side, the west side of Midtown Manhattan, the west side of Lower Manhattan including Greenwich Village and the Financial District, and parts of southern Brooklyn, including Borough Park. The incumbent is Democrat Jerry Nadler, who was re-elected with 82.1% of the vote in 2018.

Democratic primary

Candidates

Declared
 Lindsey Boylan, former Deputy Secretary for Economic Development and Special Advisor to the Governor
 Jonathan Herzog, Harvard Law School student and former staffer for Andrew Yang's presidential campaign
 Jerry Nadler, incumbent U.S. representative

Did not qualify for ballot access
 Darryl Hendricks, personal trainer
 Holly Lynch, former advertising executive
Robert Wyman, co-founder of a geothermal heating business

Withdrew
 Amanda Frankel

Debates

Endorsements

Primary results

Republican primary

Candidates

Declared
Cathy Bernstein, financial advisor

Endorsements

Independents

Candidates

Declared
 Jeanne Nigro, self-help minister

General election

Predictions

Results

District 11

The 11th district contains the entirety of Staten Island and parts of southern Brooklyn, including the neighborhoods of Bay Ridge, Bath Beach, Dyker Heights, southwestern Gravesend, western Sheepshead Bay, and parts of southern Bensonhurst. The incumbent is Democrat Max Rose, who flipped the district and was elected with 53.0% of the vote in 2018, only the second time the House district flipped blue for the Democratic Party since Republicans won the seat in 1980.

Based on city and state-reported election night results, with all election districts reporting, in 2020 the traditionally conservative 11th district reverted to the Republican Party. While polls had predicted a close race, Conservative/Republican challenger Assemblywoman Nicole Malliotakis defeated Democratic freshman incumbent Rose to win the seat back for the GOP by a 6.4 point margin. Malliotakis earned 53.2 percent of the vote in the district over Rose's 46.8 percent. Malliotakis won her home borough of Staten Island while Rose won the Brooklyn portion of the district. Rose formally conceded the race to Malliotakis on November 12. Final recanvassing and certification of results happened within 25 days of the November 3 general election.

Democratic primary

Candidates

Declared
 Max Rose, U.S. representative

Withdrawn
 Richard-Olivier Marius, former volunteer for Max Rose

Endorsements

Republican primary

Candidates

Declared
 Joe Caldarera, former special victims prosecutor
 Nicole Malliotakis, state assemblywoman and nominee for mayor of New York City in 2017

Withdrawn 
Joey Saladino, YouTube content creator (endorsed Caldarera)

Declined
 Joe Borelli, New York City councilman
 Michael Grimm, former U.S. representative

Endorsements

Primary results

General election

Predictions

Polling

Results

District 12

The 12th district includes several neighborhoods in the East Side of Manhattan, the Greenpoint section of Brooklyn, western Queens, including Astoria and Long Island City. The incumbent is Democrat Carolyn Maloney, who was re-elected with 86.4% of the vote in 2018.

Democratic primary

Candidates

Declared
 Lauren Ashcraft, JPMorgan Chase project manager, activist, and comedian
 Peter Harrison, housing activist
 Carolyn Maloney, incumbent U.S. representative
 Suraj Patel, professor at New York University, lawyer, and candidate for New York's 12th congressional district in 2018

Withdrawn
 Erica Vladimer, attorney and former New York State Senate staffer

Declined
 Dawn Smalls, attorney and candidate for New York City Public Advocate in 2019

Endorsements

Primary results

Republican primary

Candidates

Declared
 Carlos Santiago-Cano, real estate broker

General election

Predictions

Results

District 13

The 13th district encompasses the Upper Manhattan neighborhoods of Harlem, Washington Heights, and Inwood, as well the western Bronx neighborhoods of Kingsbridge and Bedford Park. The incumbent is Democrat Adriano Espaillat, who was re-elected with 94.6% of the vote in 2018.

Democratic primary

Candidates

Declared
 Adriano Espaillat, incumbent U.S. representative
 James Felton Keith, entrepreneur
 Ramon Rodriguez, business etiquette executive

Endorsements

Primary results

Republican primary

Candidates

Declared
 Lovelynn Gwinn, landlord

General election

Predictions

Results

District 14

The 14th district covers the eastern part of the Bronx and part of north-central Queens, including the neighborhoods of College Point, Corona, East Elmhurst, Jackson Heights, and Woodside. The incumbent was Democrat Alexandria Ocasio-Cortez, who had been elected with 78.2% of the vote in 2018. Ocasio-Cortez easily won the Democratic primary against former CNBC anchor Michelle Caruso-Cabrera, her large margin of victory was partly attributed by Fortunes Rey Mashayekhi to her substantial fundraising advantage and focus on digital advertising.

Democratic primary

Candidates

Declared
 Michelle Caruso-Cabrera, business news reporter
 Badrun Khan, activist
 Alexandria Ocasio-Cortez, incumbent U.S. representative
 Sam Sloan, perennial candidate and chess player

Withdrawn
 Fernando Cabrera, New York City councillor
 Jose Velazquez, former ESL student
 James Dillon, activist

Declined
 Elizabeth Crowley, former New York City councilwoman (running for Queens borough president)
 Joe Crowley, former U.S. Representative (NY-14)
 Julia Salazar, state senator
 Jimmy Van Bramer, New York City councilman

Debates

Endorsements

Primary results

Republican primary

Candidates

Declared
 John Cummings, former police officer

Withdrawn
 Jineea Butler
 Miguel Hernandez, construction contractor
Scherie Murray, businesswoman and candidate for New York State Assembly in 2015
 Ruth Papazian, health and medical writer
 Rey Solano
 Antoine Tucker, businessman (on the ballot as a write-in candidate)

General election

Predictions

Results

District 15

The 15th district is located entirely within the Bronx, including the neighborhoods of Hunts Point, Castle Hill, and Tremont. According to the Cook Partisan Voting Index, the 15th district is one of the most Democratic congressional districts in the country, with a PVI of D+39. As a result, victory in the Democratic Primary in the district would be tantamount to election. The incumbent Democrat, José E. Serrano, announced on March 25, 2019, that he had been diagnosed with Parkinson's disease and would not be seeking re-election.

Democratic primary

Candidates

Declared
 Frangell Basora, former congressional intern
 Michael Blake, state assemblyman and vice chair of the Democratic National Committee
 Rubén Díaz Sr., New York City councilman
Mark Escoffery-Bey, small business owner
 Samelys López, progressive activist and co-founder of Bronx Progressives
 Melissa Mark-Viverito, former speaker of the New York City Council
 Chivona Newsome, finance specialist, co-founder of Black Lives Matter of Greater NY
 Julio Pabon, marketing executive
 Tomás Ramos, director of the Bronx River Community Center
 Ydanis Rodríguez, New York City councilman
Marlene Tapper, political consultant
 Ritchie Torres, New York City councilman
Jonathan Ortiz, New York City Financial Advisor

Withdrawn
 Marlene Cintron, president of the Bronx Overall Economic Development Corporation
 David P. Franks Jr., New York City police Sergeant (write-in)

Declined
 Eric Stevenson, former state assemblyman (running for state assembly)
Elías Alcántara, former White House senior associate director for intergovernmental affairs
 Marcos Crespo, state assemblyman and chair of the Bronx Democratic County Committee
 Nathalia Fernandez, state assemblywoman
 Vanessa Gibson, New York City councilwoman
 Carl Heastie, speaker of the New York Assembly
 Gustavo Rivera, state senator
 Amanda Septimo, former district director for José E. Serrano (running for state assembly)
 Luis R. Sepúlveda, state senator
 José E. Serrano, incumbent U.S. representative
 José M. Serrano, state senator and son of the incumbent

Debates

Endorsements

Polling

Primary results

Republican primary

Candidates

Declared
 Orlando Molina

General election

Predictions

Results

District 16

The 16th district contains the northern parts of the Bronx and the southern half of Westchester County, including the cities of Mount Vernon, Yonkers, and Rye. The incumbent was Democrat Eliot Engel.

Democratic primary

Candidates

Declared
 Jamaal Bowman, middle school principal
 Eliot Engel, incumbent U.S. representative
 Christopher Fink, tax attorney
 Sammy Ravelo, U.S. Army veteran and retired NYPD lieutenant

Withdrawn
 Kenny Belvin, political scientist (endorsed Ghebreghiorgis)
 Andom Ghebreghiorgis, special education teacher (endorsed Bowman)

Debates

Endorsements

Polling

with Eliot Engel and Generic Democrat Who is More Liberal

Primary results

General election

Predictions

Results

District 17

The 17th district encompasses the lower Hudson Valley taking in Rockland County as well as northwestern and central Westchester County. The incumbent was Democrat Nita Lowey, who was re-elected with 88.0% of the vote in 2018, without major-party opposition. On October 10, 2019, Lowey announced she was retiring from Congress and would not seek re-election.

Democratic primary

Candidates

Declared
 David Buchwald, state assemblyman
 David Carlucci, state senator
 Asha Castleberry-Hernandez, U.S. Army veteran and national security expert
 Evelyn Farkas, former Deputy Assistant Secretary of Defense for Russia, Ukraine, and Eurasia
 Allison Fine, former chairwoman of NARAL
 Mondaire Jones, attorney
 Adam Schleifer, former federal prosecutor for Operation Varsity Blues

Withdrawn
 Catherine Borgia, Westchester County legislator (endorsed Buchwald)
Duane Jackson, Buchanan trustee and candidate for New York's 18th congressional district in 2012
 David Katz, debt-recovery attorney (endorsed Jones)
 Catherine Parker, Westchester County legislator (endorsed Jones) (remained on ballot)
 Jo-Anna Rodriguez-Wheeler, small business owner

Declined
 Tom Abinanti, state assemblyman (running for re-election)
 Chelsea Clinton, global health advocate and member of the Clinton family
 Andrew Cuomo, Governor of New York
 Paul Feiner, Greenburgh town supervisor
 George Latimer, Westchester County executive and former state senator (endorsed Buchwald)
 Nita Lowey, incumbent U.S. Representative

Campaign
Incumbent representative Nita Lowey had served as U.S. Representative for the area since 1988, and had not faced a primary challenger or serious Republican opponent in that time. On August 19, 2019, attorney and former Justice Department official Mondaire Jones announced a primary challenge to Lowey, her first since 1988, citing a range of issues on which he felt Lowey was not left-wing enough. On October 10, Lowey announced that she was retiring in a surprise announcement. Following Lowey's retirement, several Democratic candidates announced campaigns for the seat. In the resulting primary, four frontrunners emerged; Jones, Evelyn Farkas, a former Deputy Assistant Secretary of Defence, David Carlucci, a state senator and former member of the Independent Democratic Conference (IDC), and Adam Schleifer, a former federal prosecutor who used his considerable personal wealth to self-finance his campaign.

In the ensuing campaign, Carlucci attacked the other three main candidates, accusing them of being carpetbaggers, while Jones also attacked the other major candidates, accusing them of being more akin to Republicans than Democrats. Carlucci was felt to be a formidable candidate, as he was considered to have a lock on support from voters west of the Hudson River, which bisects the district. However, his past association with the IDC earned him the enmity of both progressive and more moderate Democrats. Six of the eight members of the former IDC had been primaried in 2018, with Carlucci being one of the two survivors. Pro-choice groups devoted money and resources to opposing his bid, as during his period in the state senate he had helped block pro-abortion legislation.

By January 2020, Schleifer was leading the field in fundraising, having raised $1 million largely through self-financing. Schleifer attracted personal criticism for self-financing rather than campaigning through donations, and Farkas also criticised him for refusing to divest from stocks while campaigning. In response, Schleifer called Farkas a "snake", and declared that "all [she] knows is the fog of the beltway". Controversy arose between the two campaigns when Farkas sent a mailer to voters in the district denouncing Schleifer, which featured an image of a man stuffing money into another man's pocket. Schleifer, who is Jewish, accused Farkas of anti-semitism in response to the mailer, claiming that it played on negative stereotypes of Jews. Farkas campaign spokesperson Wellesley Daniels rejected the accusations, calling them "disgusting".

Carlucci's campaign began to falter as the primary went on, suffering from poor fundraising and a lack of prominent endorsements, while Jones began to gain traction as endorsements and donations from national progressives boosted his candidacy.

Debates

Endorsements

Polling

Primary results

Republican primary

Candidates

Declared
 Yehudis Gottesfeld, chemical engineer
 Maureen McArdle-Schulman, former FDNY firefighter

Withdrawn
 Josh Eisen, businessman (ran as an independent)

Declined
 Rob Astorino, former Westchester County Executive, 2014 nominee for governor of New York
 Ron Belmont, mayor of Harrison
 Ed Day, Rockland County executive
 Leigh McHugh, Rockland County Legislator

Campaign
Originally, businessman Josh Eisen was considered the Republican frontrunner, as he had posted relatively strong fundraising numbers. However, his campaign imploded when allegations were revealed that he had threatened former employees, and that while embroiled in a legal dispute he had told his opponents' wife that she would "bathe in the warm semen of Mengele" and had also written sexual polemics about this same opponents' daughter. This revelation caused the local Rockland and Westchester Republican parties to disavow Eisen's campaign, and he withdrew from the race. Eisen's withdrawal paved the way for two other candidates, retired firefighter Maureen McArdle-Schulman and chemical engineer Yehudis Gottesfeld, to compete for the nomination.

Endorsements

Primary results

General election

Predictions

Results

District 18

The 18th district is located in the mid-Hudson Valley covering all of Orange County and Putnam County, as well as parts of southern Dutchess County and northeastern Westchester County, including the city of Poughkeepsie. The incumbent is Democrat Sean Patrick Maloney, who was re-elected with 55.5% of the vote in 2018.

Democratic primary

Candidates

Declared
 Sean Patrick Maloney, incumbent U.S. representative

Endorsements

Republican primary

Candidates

Declared
 Chele Farley, investment banker and nominee for U.S. Senate in 2018

Endorsements

Third parties

Candidates

Declared
 Scott Smith, former Middletown town councilman and candidate for New York's 18th congressional district in 2014

General election

Predictions

Polling

Results

District 19

The 19th district is based in the upper Hudson Valley and Catskills. The incumbent is Democrat Antonio Delgado, who flipped the district and was elected with 51.4% of the vote in 2018.

Democratic primary

Candidates

Declared
 Antonio Delgado, incumbent U.S. representative

Endorsements

Republican primary

Candidates

Declared
 Ola Hawatmeh, fashion designer and philanthropist
 Kyle Van De Water, former Millbrook village trustee and attorney

Withdrew
 Tony German, former New York National Guard adjutant general
 Mike Roth, activist

Declined
 John Faso, former U.S. representative
 Steven McLaughlin, Rensselaer County executive and former state assemblyman
 Marc Molinaro, Dutchess County executive, nominee for Governor of New York in 2018, and former state assemblyman
 Sue Serino, state senator

Primary results

General election

Predictions

Results

District 20

The 20th district is located in the Capital District and includes all of Albany and Schenectady Counties, and portions of Montgomery, Rensselaer and Saratoga Counties. The incumbent is Democrat Paul Tonko, who was re-elected with 66.5% of the vote in 2016.

Democratic primary

Candidates

Declared
 Paul Tonko, incumbent U.S. representative

Endorsements

Republican primary

Candidates

Declared
 Liz Joy, real estate agent and author

General election

Predictions

Results

District 21

The 21st district is based in upstate New York, encompassing the Adirondack Mountains and North Country regions. The incumbent is Republican Elise Stefanik, who was re-elected with 56.1% of the vote in 2018.

Republican primary

Candidates

Declared
 Elise Stefanik, incumbent U.S. representative

Endorsements

Democratic primary

Candidates

Declared
 Tedra Cobb, former St. Lawrence County legislator and nominee for New York's 21st congressional district in 2018

Declined
 Simon Conroy, Clinton County legislator

Endorsements

General election

Predictions

Results

District 22

The 22nd district is based in central New York and the Mohawk Valley, including the cities of Utica, Rome, Cortland and Binghamton. The incumbent is Democrat Anthony Brindisi, who flipped the district and was elected with 50.9% of the vote in 2018. This was a rematch of the 2018 election where Brindisi unseated Tenney.

The election went into lengthy legal proceedings during the counting of absentee ballots. Several errors by county boards of election were uncovered during the proceedings, affecting thousands of voters. 
The Oneida County Board of Elections used sticky notes to mark disputed ballots, which fell off and adhered to other ballots: this came to be called "stickygate".
More significantly, Oneida County failed to process registrations for 2,400 voters, 
and incorrectly rejected 700 absentee ballots. Oneida County would later face legal action from the federal Department of Justice over these errors. Other county boards of elections also made errors affecting dozens of ballots.

The seat officially became vacant when Brindisi's term expired on January 3, 2021. 
On February 5, 2021, Judge Scott DelConte ruled that Tenney had won the election by 109 votes. 
Brindisi conceded the election on February 8.

Democratic primary

Candidates

Declared
 Anthony Brindisi, incumbent U.S. representative

Republican primary

Candidates

Declared
 George Phillips, teacher, former Broome County legislator, and nominee for New York's 22nd congressional district in 2008 and 2010
 Claudia Tenney, former U.S. representative

Withdrawn
 Steve Cornwell, Broome County district attorney
 Franklin Sager, teacher

Declined
 Richard C. David, mayor of Binghamton

Primary results

General election

Predictions

Endorsements

Polling

Results

District 23

The 23rd district is based in the Southern Tier, adjacent to Lake Erie and the state's border with Pennsylvania, and is home to the cities of Jamestown, Olean, Elmira, and Ithaca. The incumbent is Republican Tom Reed, who was re-elected with 54.2% of the vote in 2018.

Republican primary

Candidates

Declared
 Tom Reed, incumbent U.S. representative

Withdrawn
 Casey McDonald, real estate developer and activist

Democratic primary

Candidates

Declared
 Tracy Mitrano, cyber security expert and nominee for New York's 23rd congressional district in 2018

Withdrawn
 Scott Noren, physician and U.S. Army veteran

Endorsements

General election

Predictions

Polling

with Generic Republican and Generic Democrat

Results

District 24

The 24th district is centered around the Syracuse area and contains Cayuga, Onondaga, and Wayne counties, as well as western Oswego County. The incumbent is Republican John Katko, who was re-elected with 52.6% of the vote in 2018.

Republican primary

Candidates

Declared
 John Katko, incumbent U.S. representative

Democratic primary

Candidates

Declared
 Dana Balter, nonprofit leader, Syracuse University professor, and nominee for New York's 24th congressional district in 2018
 Francis Conole, former intelligence officer and U.S. Navy veteran

Withdrew
 Roger Misso, U.S. Navy veteran

Endorsements

Polling

Primary results

General election

Predictions

Polling

Results

District 25

The 25th district is located entirely within Monroe County, encompassing Rochester and the surrounding suburbs, including Irondequoit and Brighton. The incumbent is Democrat Joseph Morelle, who was elected with 59.0% of the vote in 2018.

Democratic primary

Candidates

Declared
 Robin Wilt, Brighton town councilwoman and candidate for New York's 25th congressional district in 2018
 Joseph Morelle, incumbent U.S. representative

Endorsements

Primary results

Republican primary

Candidates

Declared 
George Mitris, businessman

General election

Predictions

Results

District 26

The 26th district is centered around the city of Buffalo and its inner suburbs, including Cheektowaga, Tonawanda, Amherst, Grand Island, and Niagara Falls. The incumbent is Democrat Brian Higgins, who was re-elected with 73.3% of the vote in 2018.

Democratic primary

Candidates

Declared
 Brian Higgins, incumbent U.S. representative

Endorsements

Republican primary

Candidates

Declared
Ricky Donovan, retired corrections officer

General election

Predictions

Results

District 27

The 27th district is based in rural western New York and covers the outer suburbs of Buffalo and Rochester. The former incumbent Republican Chris Collins, pled guilty to charges of insider trading and resigned his seat effective immediately on October 1, 2019. Republican Chris Jacobs won the special election to replace Collins on June 23, 2020.

Republican primary

Candidates

Declared
Chris Jacobs, state senator
Stefan Mychajliw Jr, Erie County comptroller
Beth Parlato, attorney and former Darien town justice

Endorsements

Polling

Collins vs. Jacobs vs. Parlato

Collins vs. Mychajlw vs. Parlato

Bellavia vs. Hawley vs. Jacobs vs. Mychajlw vs. Ortt vs. Parlato

Bellavia vs. Jacobs vs. Parlato

Primary results

Democratic primary

Candidates

Declared
Nate McMurray, former Grand Island supervisor and nominee for New York's 27th congressional district in 2018

Endorsements

General election

Predictions

Results

See also
 2020 New York state elections

Notes 

Partisan clients

References

External links
 
 
  (State affiliate of the U.S. League of Women Voters)
 

Official campaign websites for 1st district candidates
 Nancy Goroff (D) for Congress
 Lee Zeldin (R) for Congress

Official campaign websites for 2nd district candidates
 Harry R. Burger (G) for Congress
 Andrew Garbarino (R) for Congress
 Jackie Gordon (D) for Congress
 Daniel Craig Ross (I) for Congress 

Official campaign websites for 3rd district candidates
 George A. Santos (R) for Congress
 Thomas Suozzi (D) for Congress

Official campaign websites for 4th district candidates
 Joseph R. Naham (G) for Congress
 Kathleen Rice (D) for Congress
 Douglas Tuman (R) for Congress 

Official campaign websites for 5th district candidates
 Amit Lal (I) for Congress
 Gregory Meeks (D) for Congress
 Jay Sanchez (L) for Congress

Official campaign websites for 6th district candidates
 Grace Meng (D) for Congress
 Tom Zmich (R) for Congress

Official campaign websites for 7th district candidates
 Brian Kelly (R) for Congress
 Nydia Velázquez (D) for Congress

Official campaign websites for 8th district candidates
 Hakeem Jeffries (D) for Congress

Official campaign websites for 9th district candidates
 Joel Azumah (SAM) for Congress
 Yvette Clarke (D) for Congress

Official campaign websites for 10th district candidates
 Cathy Bernstein (R) for Congress
 Michael Madrid (L) for Congress
 Jerry Nadler (D) for Congress
 Jeanne Nigro (I) for Congress

Official campaign websites for 11th district candidates
 Nicole Malliotakis (R) for Congress
 Max Rose (D) for Congress 

Official campaign websites for 12th district candidates
 Steven Kolln (L) for Congress
 Carolyn Maloney (D) for Congress
 Carlos Santiago-Cano (R) for Congress

Official campaign websites for 13th district candidates
 Adriano Espaillat (D) for Congress
 Lovelynn Gwinn (R) for Congress

Official campaign websites for 14th district candidates
 Michelle Caruso-Cabrera (SAM) for Congress 
 John Cummings (R) for Congress
 Alexandria Ocasio-Cortez (D) for Congress

Official campaign websites for 15th district candidates
 Patrick Delices (C) for Congress
 Ritchie Torres (D) for Congress

Official campaign websites for 16th district candidates
 Jamaal Bowman (D) for Congress

Official campaign websites for 17th district candidates
 Josh Eisen (I) for Congress
 Yehudis Gottesfeld (C) for Congress
 Mondaire Jones (D) for Congress
 Maureen McArdle-Schulman (R) for Congress 

Official campaign websites for 18th district candidates
 Chele Farley (R) for Congress
 Sean Patrick Maloney (D) for Congress 
 Scott Smith (L) for Congress

Official campaign websites for 19th district candidates
 Victoria Alexander (L) for Congress
 Antonio Delgado (D) for Congress
 Steve Greenfield (G) for Congress
 Kyle Van De Water (R) for Congress 

Official campaign websites for 20th district candidates
 Liz Joy (R) for Congress
 Paul Tonko (D) for Congress 

Official campaign websites for 21st district candidates
 Tedra Cobb (D) for Congress
 Elise Stefanik (R) for Congress

Official campaign websites for 22nd district candidates
 Anthony Brindisi (D) for Congress 
 Claudia Tenney (R) for Congress

Official campaign websites for 23rd district candidates
 Tracy Mitrano (D) for Congress
 Tom Reed (R) for Congress

Official campaign websites for 24th district candidates
 Dana Balter (D) for Congress
 John Katko (R) for Congress

Official campaign websites for 25th district candidates
 George Mitris (R) for Congress
 Joseph Morelle (D) for Congress
 Kevin Wilson (L) for Congress 

Official campaign websites for 26th district candidates
 Brian Higgins (D) for Congress
 Michael Raleigh (G) for Congress 

Official campaign websites for 27th district candidates
 Chris Jacobs (R) for Congress
 Nate McMurray (D) for Congress
 Duane Whitmer (L) for Congress

New York
2020
House